These are the official results of the Men's Triple Jump event at the 1987 IAAF World Championships in Rome, Italy. There were a total of 32 participating athletes, with two qualifying groups and the final held on Monday August 31, 1987.

Medalists

Schedule
All times are Central European Time (UTC+1)

Records
Existing records at the start of the event.

Final

Qualifying round
Held on Sunday 1987-08-30 with the mark set at 17.00 metres

See also
 1982 Men's European Championships Triple Jump (Athens)
 1983 Men's World Championships Triple Jump (Helsinki)
 1984 Men's Olympic Triple Jump (Los Angeles)
 1986 Men's European Championships Triple Jump (Stuttgart)
 1988 Men's Olympic Triple Jump (Seoul)
 1991 Men's World Championships Triple Jump (Tokyo)

References
 Results

T
Triple jump at the World Athletics Championships